The Financial Express is an Indian English-language business newspaper owned by The Indian Express Group. It has been published by the Indian Express group since 1961. The Financial Express specialises in Indian and international business and financial news. Its editor is Shyamal Majumdar.

The paper publishes 11 editions from a number of Indian cities. It also gives out two noteworthy awards - FE India's Best Bank Awards and FE-EVI Green Business Leadership Awards.

References

External links
 
 Financial Express ePaper (E-Paper – Digital Replica of the newspaper)
 Financial Express Hindi website

Business newspapers published in India
Indian Express Limited
Newspapers published in Kolkata
English-language newspapers published in India
Mass media companies based in Delhi
Companies based in New Delhi
Publications established in 1961
1961 establishments in Uttar Pradesh